Stanimir Nenov (born 17 November 1955) is a Bulgarian middle-distance runner. He competed in the men's 3000 metres steeplechase at the 1980 Summer Olympics.

References

External links
 

1955 births
Living people
Athletes (track and field) at the 1980 Summer Olympics
Bulgarian male middle-distance runners
Bulgarian male steeplechase runners
Olympic athletes of Bulgaria
Sportspeople from Varna, Bulgaria